Mintho rufiventris is a European species of fly in the family Tachinidae.

References

Tachininae
Diptera of Europe
Insects described in 1817
Taxa named by Carl Fredrik Fallén
Diptera of Asia